The 2022 Scotland Tri-Nation Series was the 14th round of the 2019–2023 ICC Cricket World Cup League 2 cricket tournament that took place in Scotland in July 2022. It was a tri-nation series between Namibia, Nepal and the Scotland cricket teams, with the matches played as One Day International (ODI) fixtures. The ICC Cricket World Cup League 2 formed part of the qualification pathway to the 2023 Cricket World Cup.

After being originally scheduled to take place in Scotland in 2020, the series was rescheduled to take place in Spain in July 2021.  However, in June 2021, the series was postponed by a year, after the Namibian team were unable to travel due to the COVID-19 pandemic. The rescheduled fixtures were announced in May 2022, with all the matches played at Titwood in Glasgow and the Cambusdoon New Ground in Ayr.

Background
Originally the series was scheduled to take place in July 2020. Four matches were scheduled to be played in Glasgow at Titwood, the home ground of Clydesdale Cricket Club, with the other two fixtures being played at The Grange Club in Edinburgh. However, due to the COVID-19 pandemic, all cricket facilities in Scotland were closed until 1 July 2020. On 10 June 2020, the International Cricket Council (ICC) confirmed that the tournament had been postponed due to the pandemic. In December 2020, the ICC announced the rescheduled dates for the series.

After being rescheduled to take place in Scotland in July 2021, the tri-series was later moved to Spain, due to the COVID-19 pandemic. In June 2021, the Cricket Association of Nepal (CAN) named a twenty-man preliminary squad for the series. On 24 June 2021, the series was postponed to July 2022, due to restrictions imposed in Namibia arising from the COVID-19 pandemic.

Squads

On the day prior to the start of the series, Scotland named Alasdair Evans and Chris Greaves in their squad, replacing Dylan Budge and Chris Sole.

Fixtures

1st ODI

2nd ODI

3rd ODI

4th ODI

5th ODI

6th ODI

References

External links
 Series home at ESPN Cricinfo

2022 in Scottish cricket
2022 in Namibian cricket
2022 in Nepalese cricket
International cricket competitions in 2022
Scotland
Scotland
Scotland Tri-Nation Series